Steffen Uliczka (born 17 July 1984 in Preetz) is a German track and field athlete who mainly competes in the 3000 metres steeplechase. He was the 2010 winner of the Warandecross cross country meeting in Tilburg, Netherlands. In 2014 he turned to long-distance running.

Achievements

References

External links 
 

1984 births
Living people
People from Preetz
German national athletics champions
German male middle-distance runners
German male steeplechase runners
Athletes (track and field) at the 2012 Summer Olympics
Olympic athletes of Germany
Universiade medalists in athletics (track and field)
Universiade bronze medalists for Germany
Medalists at the 2009 Summer Universiade
Sportspeople from Schleswig-Holstein
21st-century German people